The 2017 Victorian Football League season is the 136th season of the Victorian Football Association/Victorian Football League Australian rules football competition. The competition began on 8 April and concluded with the Grand Final on 24 September 2017.

The Grand Final was won by Port Melbourne, who defeated the Richmond reserves by four points at Etihad Stadium.

League membership
At the end of the 2016 season, AFL Victoria terminated the licence of the Frankston Football Club due to its financial position, which was no longer considered viable. The club had suffered a severe downturn in the profitability of its pokies licence over the previous few years, and by 2016 the machines were generating a loss for the club. The club terminated the pokies licence in May 2016, but by that time owed more than $1,500,000, both to the state gaming regulators and other creditors. The club went into voluntary administration in August, and the club's VFL licence was terminated the following month, in the week after the VFL Grand Final. The club's immediate existence was saved when creditors, including the gaming regulators, agreed to waive more than 90% of the club's debt, and it came out of administration in late November 2016, but was still excluded from the 2017 season. The club then embarked on a campaign to assure its long-term viability, which included signing up 1200 members and working to improve its relationship with the local leagues as a pathway for Mornington Peninsula footballers into state football. The club applied for and was re-granted its VFL licence for the 2018 season, meaning it missed only one season of football.

There had been an expectation over the previous few years that the Australian Football League's St Kilda Football Club would terminate its reserves affiliation with Sandringham at the end of 2016 and enter a stand-alone reserves team into the VFL. However, after renegotiations during 2016, a new rolling affiliation deal with no fixed term was signed the two clubs to begin in 2017. The new deal changed the nature of the affiliation, expanding St Kilda's involvement in Sandringham's operation: this included removing a stipulation from the previous agreement that no more than 14 St Kilda listed players could play in Sandringham's senior team in any given match. The deal will also result in the club playing three games per year in St Kilda colours from the 2018 season at St Kilda's former home ground Moorabbin Oval.

The Casey Scorpions were renamed the Casey Demons, to co-brand the club with its AFL-affiliate, . The club changed its guernsey design to match that of the Melbourne Football Club.

Premiership season
Source: VFL season 2017 Results and Fixtures

Round 1

Round 2

Round 3

Round 4

Round 5

Round 6

Round 7

Round 8

Round 9

Round 10

Round 11

Round 12

Round 13

Round 14

Round 15

Round 16

Round 17

Round 18

Round 19

Ladder

Finals series

Qualifying and Elimination Finals

Semi-finals

Preliminary Finals

Grand Final

Awards
 The Frosty Miller Medal was won by Jordan Lisle (Port Melbourne), who kicked 46 goals during the home-and-away season.
The J. J. Liston Trophy was won by Jacob Townsend (Richmond reserves), who polled 18 votes. 2016 winner Michael Gibbons (Williamstown) finished second with 16 votes, and Adam Marcon (Williamstown) and Matt Hanson (Werribee) were equal third with 14 votes.
The Fothergill–Round Medal was won by Bayley Fritsch (Casey Demons).
The last ever Development League premiership before the reserves competition was wound up at the end of the 2017 season was won by Casey. Casey 13.16 (94) defeated Williamstown 11.16 (82) in the Grand Final, played at Fortburn Stadium on 17 September as a curtain-raiser to the seniors first preliminary final.

Notable events
Werribee's home ground, Avalon Airport Oval, was unavailable throughout the 2017 season as it was being upgraded. Rather than setting up a permanent alternative, the club played all nine of its home games at different venues, in Torquay, North Melbourne, Wangaratta, Carlton, Docklands, Frankston, Craigieburn, Hoppers Crossing and Footscray.
After a successful two-year contract, a new two-year broadcast deal covering the 2017 and 2018 seasons was signed between the VFL and Seven Network.
Eventual premiers Port Melbourne fell on financial hardships prior to the 2017 season, and the entire playing and coaching list forwent match payments in the club's Round 1 match.
North Ballarat's home ground, Eureka Stadium, underwent a change in management at the start of the season when the entire precinct was compulsorily acquired by the City of Ballarat. The arena and part of the outer was already crown land, with the rest being owned on freehold title by the football club; but the council acquired the entire precinct as it needed to be upgraded for an Australian Football League game in August – the first ever to be staged at the venue – and the council did not have faith that the North Ballarat Football Club board, which had recently undergone a significant and unstable period of change, would be able to manage the works. The club received $5.5M in compensation for the acquisition and an interim lease to use the ground in the 2017 VFL season. These issues formed part of the off-field instability which saw the club's VFL licence terminated at the end of the season.
He was only the second player who played the majority of his career in the VFA post-1897 to be inducted.

See also 
 List of VFA/VFL premiers
 Australian rules football
 Victorian Football League
 Australian Football League
 2017 AFL season

References

External links

 2017 VFL Premiership Season (Results via AustralianFootball.com).
 2017 VFL season results on Sports TG.

Victorian Football League seasons
VFL